Penicillium catenatum is an anamorph fungus species of the genus of Penicillium.

See also
List of Penicillium species

References

catenatum
Fungi described in 1968